Cream of the Crop is a studio album by American recording artist Wanda Jackson and her band The Party Timers. It was released in August 1968 via Capitol Records and contained 12 tracks. It was the twelfth studio album of Jackson's career and her second to give equal billing to The Party Timers. The project included three single releases, all of which reached charting positions on the North American country music sales chart. The album itself also reached charting positions in North America. Cream of the Crop received a positive review following its original release.

Background and content
Wanda Jackson transitioned back into country music following a series of Rockabilly releases during the 1950s with songs like "Let's Have a Party". She had commercial success in 1961 with the country songs "Right or Wrong" and "In the Middle of a Heartache". She continued recording further country albums and singles during the 1960s and became more identified with the genre throughout the decade. Cream of the Crop was among the albums Jackson recorded for the country music field during this period. The project was recorded in sessions produced by Ken Nelson, along with Kelso Herston. It was Jackson's first album co-produced and to feature Herston on studio credits. The album was recorded between June 1967 and June 1968 at the Columbia Studio in Nashville, Tennessee.

Cream of the Crop consisted of 12 recordings, all of which were composed by other songwriters besides Jackson. It was Jackson's second studio album to feature The Party Timers (her touring band), which was included performing various instruments and providing background vocals. The Party Timers were given equal billing on the album. The LP was a mixture of new recordings and cover versions of songs. The new recordings included "A Girl Don't Have to Drink to Have Fun" and "I Talk a Pretty Story". Covers included Jeannie Seely's "Don't Touch Me", Buck Owens' "Together Again" and Connie Smith's "The Hurtin's All Over".

Release and reception

Cream of the Crop was originally released in August 1968 on Capitol Records, making it Jackson's twelfth studio album. It was distributed as a vinyl LP, with six songs on either side of the record. In later decades, it was re-released through Capitol Records Nashville to digital and streaming markets, including Apple Music. The LP spent five weeks on the Billboard Top Country Albums chart in the United States, peaking at number 25 in October 1968. It was her sixth album to reach a peak position on the chart. The album received a positive response from Billboard magazine in their "album reviews" category. Writers highlighted the album's musical quality and further commented that "Wanda is one of the most polished of performers, and on this package she lends her talent to a variety of great tunes."

Three singles included on the album preceded its release. The first single issued from the album was "A Girl Don't Have to Drink to Have Fun" in October 1967. In 1968, the track peaked at number 22 on the Billboard Hot Country Singles chart, eventually becoming the album's highest-charting single. In April 1968, "My Baby Walked Right Out on Me" was issued as the project's next single. Two months later, the single peaked at number 34 on the Billboard country singles survey. The final single included from the project was "Little Boy Soldier", which was issued in July 1968. Two months later, the track peaked at number 46 on the Billboard country chart.

Track listings

Vinyl version

Digital version

Chart performance

Release history

References

1968 albums
Albums produced by Ken Nelson (United States record producer)
Capitol Records albums
Wanda Jackson albums